Tumak may refer to:
 Tumak, Astrakhan Oblast, Russia
 Tumak language
 One Million B.C., an American fantasy film
 Tumak (annelid), a genus of annelids in the family Tumakidae